Cob(I)yrinic acid a,c-diamide adenosyltransferase, mitochondrial is an enzyme that in humans is encoded by the MMAB gene.

Function 

This gene encodes an enzyme (cob(I)yrinic acid a,c-diamide adenosyltransferase) that catalyzes the final step in the conversion of vitamin B12 into adenosylcobalamin (AdoCbl), a vitamin B12-containing coenzyme for methylmalonyl-CoA mutase.

Clinical significance 

Mutations in the gene are the cause of vitamin B12-dependent methylmalonic aciduria linked to the cblB complementation group.

References

External links 
  GeneReviews/NCBI/NIH/UW entry on Methylmalonic Acidemia
 PDBe-KB provides an overview of all the structure information available in the PDB for Human Corrinoid adenosyltransferase (MMAB)

Further reading